Samuel Goode may refer to:
Samuel Goode (1756-1822), American politician
Samuel Goode (mayor) of Adelaide (1863-1864)
Sam Goode, character in I Am Number Four